Anne Dutton (1692–1765) was an English poet and Calvinist Baptist writer on religion. She published around 50 titles and corresponded with George Whitefield and John Wesley.

Life
Born in Northampton, she survived a near-fatal childhood illness, from which "she acquired an acute sense of sin." She was given a religious education.

Aged 22 she married a Mr Coles, living in London and Warwick, before being widowed five years later. She married again to Benjamin Dutton, a clothier who entered the Baptist ministry. They settled at Great Gransden, Huntingdonshire, in 1732, and paid for a chapel to be built there. A desire to give "service to the Cause of Christ" gradually overcame her ill health. In 1747 her husband travelled to America to raise money, but she became widowed again when his return ship was lost at sea.

Tracts
Dutton's Narration of the Wonders of Grace (1734) was a 1500-line poem in heroic couplets, complete with marginal references to Scripture, reviewing redemption history from the point of view of Calvinist Baptists. (A modern scholar has called it "execrable verse, interesting only as testimony to the mental tilt of a particular kind of zealot".) In her correspondence with Wesley she differed with him over the question of Election. A Brief Account of the Negroes Converted to Christ in America was one of 13 tracts and letters she published in 1743 alone. George Whitfield was another recipient of her work.

Selections from her work were republished in six volumes in 2003–2009.

Works
A narration of the wonders of grace in verse. Divided into six parts. I. Of Christ the Mediator, as set up from Everlasting in all the Glory of Headship. II. Of God's Election and Covenant-Transactions concerning a Remnant in his Son. III. Of Christ's Incarnation and Redemption. IV. Of the Work of the Spirit, respecting the Church in general, throughout the New Testament Dispensation, from Christ's Ascension to his second Coming. V. Of Christ's glorious Appearing and Kingdom. VI. Of Gog and Magog ; together with the last Judgment. To which is added, A poem on the special Work of the Spirit in the Hearts of the Elect. As also, sixty one hymns composed on several Subjects. With An Alphabetical Table, 1734
A discourse upon walking with God in a letter to a friend. Together with Some Hints upon Joseph's Blessing, Deut. 33. 13, &c. As also a brief Account how the Author was brought into Gospel-Liberty, 1735
A discourse concerning God's act of adoption To which is added, a discourse upon the inheritance of the Adopted Sons of God, 1737
A discourse concerning the new-birth to which are added two poems ; the one on salvation in Christ, by free-grace, for the chief of sinners: the other on a believer's safety and duty, 1740
A letter to all the saints : on the general duty of love: humbly presented, by one that is less than the least of them all, and unworthy to be of their happy Number, 1742
A letter to the Reverend Mr. John Wesley In vindication of the doctrines of absolute, unconditional election, particular redemption, special vocation, and final perseverance, 1742
A letter from Mrs. Anne Dutton, to the Reverend Mr. G. Whitefield, 1743
A Letter to Such of the Servants of Christ, who May have any Scruple about the Lawfulness of PRINTING any Thing written by a Woman, 1743
Letters on spiritual subjects, and divers occasions, sent to relations and friends. By one who has tasted that the Lord is gracious, 1743
A brief account of the gracious dealings of God with a poor, sinful... creature, 1750
Divine, moral, and historical Miscellanies, 1761

References

External links
Neglected Theologians #4 Anne Dutton

1692 births
1765 deaths
English women poets
English religious writers
People from Northampton
History of Baptists
English women non-fiction writers
18th-century English women writers
18th-century English women
18th-century English people